Sandra Esparon (born May 15, 1989) is a Seychellois singer and music performer. She voiced vocals in the 2005 hit single "San ou (La Rivière)" as a member of Seychellois music band Dezil'. Her career has seen her release three studio albums and receive multiple awards both locally and internationally.

Life and career
Esparon was born on May 15, 1989 in Takamaka district of Mahé, Seychelles. She began her professional music career as a member of Dezil'. In 2012, she released her second album titled Sandra Fanm Inik which won her Best Female Artist of the Year at the 2012 Seychelles Airtel Music Awards and in 2014, she released Mon Santiman. In 2014, she won Best Female Artist at the 2014 Seychelles Airtel Music Award and 5th Cable Tunes Awards respectively.

Awards and recognitions

References

1989 births
Living people
Seychellois women singers
People from Takamaka, Seychelles
21st-century Seychellois singers
21st-century women singers